Isaak Almanidis (born 5 January 1971) is a retired Greek football striker.

References

1971 births
Living people
Proodeftiki F.C. players
Paniliakos F.C. players
Aias Salamina F.C. players
Super League Greece players
Association football forwards
Footballers from Athens
Greek footballers